Svetoslav Chitakov (born 10 January 1992) is a Bulgarian footballer who plays as an attacking midfielder for Sokol Markovo. He spends his youth years at Botev Plovdiv, but he failed to make a single appearance for the club. He is prolific box-to-box midfielder, as he has good natural fitness and stamina. He spends his best years at Dunav Ruse.

Career
On the summer, 2014, he signed with FC Dunav Ruse, when they were in Third League (V group at the time), and he won the league and the amateur football league cup in his first season with the club. He was a vital part of the club during his second season, also, when they won the Second League (B group at the time). He was the first choice midfielder during the whole period, as he played as a box-to-box occupying the whole middle zone of the pitch. He left the club right before the start of the 2016-2017 Football league season.

On 21 January 2017, Chitakov signed with Oborishte Panagyurishte.

In July 2018, Chitakov joined OFC Gigant Saedinenie.

In January 2020, Chitakov joined Spartak Plovdiv. He played the first 3 games in Bulgaria Third Amateur Football League as a midfielder. He also played in the first cup round against Atletik Kuklen.

He signed with Sokol Markovo. for a year and a half in the summer of 2020. He played mainly as a striker or attacking midfielder during his time with the club. In season 2020/2021 he scored 8 goals in his first 8 games.

Honours
FC Dunav Ruse
 Bulgaria V Group: 2014-2015 Bulgaria V group winner
 Bulgaria B Group: 2015-2016 Bulgaria B group winner
 Bulgaria Cup of Amateur football league: 2015 Cup winner

References

External links

Living people
1992 births
Bulgarian footballers
Association football midfielders
FC Spartak Plovdiv players
FC Dunav Ruse players
FC Oborishte players
FC Maritsa Plovdiv players
FC Botev Galabovo players
First Professional Football League (Bulgaria) players
Second Professional Football League (Bulgaria) players